"Sun City" is a 1985 protest song written by Steven Van Zandt, produced by Van Zandt and Arthur Baker and recorded by Artists United Against Apartheid to convey opposition to the South African policy of apartheid. The song declared that all the artists involved would refuse to perform at Sun City, a resort which was located in the bantustan of Bophuthatswana, one of a number of internationally unrecognized states created by the South African government to forcibly relocate its black population.

Recording
Van Zandt was interested in writing a song about South Africa's Sun City casino resort, to make parallels with the plight of Native Americans. Danny Schechter, at the time a journalist with ABC News' 20/20, suggested that the song should be a different kind of "We Are the World", or as Schechter explained, "a song about change not charity, freedom not famine."

As Van Zandt was writing it, Schechter suggested that he include the names of the artists who had played Sun City in defiance of a United Nations-sanctioned cultural boycott. "I was probably still thinking of 20/20's exposé of conservative Africanists 15 years earlier", says Schechter.

References to specific performers who had played in Sun City appeared in the demo but were omitted from the final version. Paul Simon declined to contribute, as he felt the list of names was inappropriate: "You've got to give people a chance to say, 'I shouldn't have done that.'" Among the names was Simon's friend Linda Ronstadt. Simon defended Ronstadt, saying: "I know that her intention was never to support the government there ... She made a mistake. She's extremely liberal in her political thinking and unquestionably antiapartheid." Simon also felt his upcoming album Graceland, recorded in South Africa and released the following year, would be his "own statement" on the issue. Ronstadt provided guest vocals on that album.

When Van Zandt was finished writing "Sun City", he, Baker and Schechter spent the next several months searching for artists to participate in recording it. Van Zandt initially declined to invite Bruce Springsteen, not wanting to take advantage of their friendship, but Schechter had no problem asking himself; Springsteen accepted the invitation. Van Zandt also had reservations about inviting jazz giant Miles Davis, whom Schechter also contacted; with minimal persuasion, Davis also accepted. Eventually, Van Zandt, Baker and Schechter gathered a wide array of artists, including DJ Kool Herc, Grandmaster Melle Mel, The Fat Boys, Rubén Blades, Bob Dylan, Herbie Hancock, Ringo Starr and his son Zak Starkey, Lou Reed, Run-DMC, Peter Gabriel, David Ruffin, Eddie Kendricks, Darlene Love, Bobby Womack, Afrika Bambaataa, Kurtis Blow, Jackson Browne and Daryl Hannah (his girlfriend at the time), Bono, George Clinton, Keith Richards, Ronnie Wood, Peter Wolf, Bonnie Raitt, Daryl Hall and John Oates, Jimmy Cliff, Big Youth, Michael Monroe, Peter Garrett, Ron Carter, Ray Barretto, Gil Scott-Heron, Kashif, Nona Hendryx, Pete Townshend, Pat Benatar, Clarence Clemons, Stiv Bators, and Joey Ramone.

Composition 
The song combines elements of hip-hop (which was beginning to achieve mainstream popularity at the time), R&B, and hard rock. The main hook is multiple successive artists singing "I, I, I, I, I, I", followed by all the artists together singing "ain't gonna play Sun City!"

A music video directed by Jonathan Demme with Godley & Creme was also produced.

Reception
Billboard magazine's review of the single stated that it "showcases an overwhelming array of all-star voices, keeps up a blistering urban/dance tempo, and pulls no punches on the message."

"Sun City" reached  on the Billboard Hot 100 chart in December 1985 (and #42 Cash Box). Only about half of American radio stations played "Sun City".  Some stations objecting to the lyrics' explicit criticism of US President Ronald Reagan's policy of "constructive engagement", particularly George Clinton's and Joey Ramone's lines in the song "Our government tells us / We're doing all we can / Constructive engagement is / Ronald Reagan's plan." (Ramone also expressed open discontent and criticism towards him with the Ramones song "Bonzo Goes to Bitburg".) "Sun City" was banned in apartheid South Africa itself.

It achieved chart action in a number of European countries, becoming a Top 5 hit in Sweden, Belgium and The Netherlands. It was also a top ten single in Canada in December 1985 and January 1986.

"Sun City" was selected as Record of the Year by some of the most influential music critics, because it topped the prestigious international Pazz & Jop Critics Poll for best single of the year.

Documentary
Van Zandt and Schechter also struggled to get their documentary seen. Public Broadcasting Service (PBS) refused to broadcast the non-profit film The Making of Sun City even though it won the International Documentary Association's top honors in 1986. PBS claimed the featured artists were also involved in making the film and were therefore "self-promoting". In 1987, WNYC-TV, the New York City-owned public television station, aired an updated version of the documentary, produced by filmmaker Bill Lichtenstein along with Schechter. The film included updates about the Sun City resort and apartheid, as well as the success of the Sun City video. In addition to airing the documentary, WNYC-TV made the film available over the PBS system to public television stations across the country for broadcast.

Impact
The album and single raised more than US$1 million for anti-apartheid projects, but it paled in comparison to the popular and financial success of "We Are the World". It premiered at the United Nations, thanks to the Special Committee Against Apartheid and UN officers such as Aracelly Santana.

Oliver Tambo and the ANC's school in Tanzania "was sure happy when we gave them a big check", according to Schechter.

In South Africa, "Sun City" inspired musician Johnny Clegg to create a local organization similar to Van Zandt's. "Sun City" also became the catalyst for the 1988-91 South Africa Now TV series.

Because the apartheid era in South Africa ended in 1994, the song is now very rarely heard on the radio.

Other anti-apartheid songs
"Sun City" was not the first pop song to attack apartheid. Gil Scott-Heron had recorded his song "Johannesburg" in 1975, followed by Peter Gabriel's "Biko" (1980), Randy Newman's "Christmas in Capetown" (1983), the Special AKA's "Nelson Mandela" (1984), and Stevie Wonder's "It's Wrong (Apartheid)" (1985). The integrated African band Juluka, featuring Johnny Clegg, also recorded songs in the 1980s that criticized apartheid.

See also

References

External links
 Artists United Against Apartheid at African Activist Archive Project; including documents, photographs and the video "The Making of Sun City" (1987) that includes the original video

1985 singles
Manhattan Records singles
All-star recordings
Songs against racism and xenophobia
Steven Van Zandt songs
Music videos directed by Godley and Creme
Songs about South Africa
Anti-apartheid songs
1985 songs